St. Paul, Minneapolis, & Manitoba Railway Company Shops Historic District is a group of 1882 limestone maintenance buildings in Saint Paul, Minnesota. They served the Saint Paul, Minneapolis and Manitoba Railway, which later became part of the Great Northern Railway.

The buildings, located just west of the Minnesota Transportation Museum roundhouse, have been redeveloped by the Saint Paul Port Authority and are now known as the Empire Builder Business Center.
Roseville Township in Kandiyohi County was once Incorporated by The Minneapolis- St Paul Manitoba Railway the train station was located in Hawick. Railway bonds and Abstract information  can still be found with early settlers ancestors

References

National Register of Historic Places in Saint Paul, Minnesota
Great Northern Railway (U.S.)
Historic districts on the National Register of Historic Places in Minnesota
Railway workshops in the United States
Railway workshops on the National Register of Historic Places
Railway buildings and structures on the National Register of Historic Places in Minnesota
Industrial buildings and structures on the National Register of Historic Places in Minnesota